Dresdner Verkehrsbetriebe AG (DVB) is the municipal transport company of the city of Dresden in Germany. It is a member of the Verkehrsverbund Oberelbe transport association that manages a common public transport structure for Dresden and its surrounding areas. It is also responsible for two funicular railways and three ferries across the River Elbe.

The DVB network carries some 142 million passenger journeys each year. In 2007, it generated €96.5m of revenue, covering 76% of costs.

Tramways 

The Dresden tramway system is the backbone of public transport in Dresden. The tram fleet is made up of 166 modern tramsets (with 31 older trams).

The origins of the Dresden tramway can be traced back to the year 1872, when the first horse-drawn line opened between the city centre and the former village of Blasewitz, now a borough of Dresden.

Tram network 
The Dresden tramway is a mixed system of traditional street running, especially in the inner city boroughs close to the city centre, and modern light rail.

In recent years, street running has been replaced by independent right-of-way arrangements wherever possible, and new extensions created in the same form. In November 2008, a  extension of route 7 was opened from Gorbitz to Pennrich, in Dresden's south eastern suburbs.

Unlike many other German cities of comparable size, no stadtbahn style tunnel sections or high platform stops have been created. However many tram stops have been rebuilt so as to be fully accessible to physically disabled persons, and to allow level boarding to the low floor trams that now operate most services.

Different routes can be identified by a route number and a colour code. The current routes are:

Future plans, as part of the Stadtbahnprogramm 2020, include  of new tram route, with work starting in 2014. Some  would be on reserved track, and the new routes would replace bus routes 61 and 62, some of the city's busiest, with an estimated cost of 223 million euros. The new routes comprise:

 Prager Str to Plauen Bhf via Budapester Str and Chemnitzer Str
 Großer Garten to Löbtau via Technische Universität
 City Center to Fetscherplatz via Pillnitzer Str and Striesener Str
 Sachsenallee to Max-Planck-Institute via Johannstadt
 Bühlau to Weißig

Part of the work for Stadtbahnprogramm 2020 has been completed. Routes 9 and 13 were realigned along a  section to provide better connections with regional trains at Dresden-Strehlen station in July 2019.

On all tramway routes except route 4, a general 10-minute headway is offered on weekdays, extending to 15 minutes on Saturday, Sunday and in the evening. On the main lines through the inner city, where different routes intertwine, vehicles run up to every two minutes. Route 4, which extends a considerable distance beyond the city boundary to the towns of Radebeul, Coswig and Weinböhla, operates the standard 10 or 15 minute interval service as far as Radebeul West, and a 30-minute service beyond that to Coswig and Weinböhla.

Tram fleet 
Most of the trams operating in Dresden are articulated low floor cars, of two different basic designs, each of which has several variants. The first generation of low floor cars was built by Deutsche Waggonbau (DW) in Bautzen between 1995 and 2002; both 6 and 8 axle variants exist. The second generation of low floor cars have been built since 2003 by Bombardier Transportation, also in Bautzen, and are of that manufacturer's Flexity Classic design; both 8 and 12 axle variants exist.

The fleet used to be composed of ČKD Tatra trams that provided service towards the end of the GDR era. At present some Tatra T4 cars built between 1968 and 1984 are still in service, but it is intended that they will all be replaced by 2010.

The DVB tram fleet operates out of three depots; at Gorbitz on routes 2,6 and 7 in south west Dresden, at Trachenberge on route 3 in the north-west, and Reick on routes 1, 9 and 13 in the south-east. Gorbitz is new facility opened in 1996 and includes a new central workshops. Trachenberge and Reick are older facilities that have both been heavily rebuilt to similar standards, whilst several other older depots have been closed. The former central workshops at Trachenberge, adjacent to the current depot, now house the Dresden Tram Museum, which has a collection including examples of many former Dresden trams.

CarGoTram 

The CarGoTram is a freight carrying tram that supplies Volkswagen's Transparent Factory, crossing the city. The connection by tram was established to reduce the number of trucks used. The factory is located to the east of the city centre, next to the Großer Garten, whilst the distribution depot that loads the parts is to the west of the city centre.

Buses

The routes are operated by a fleet of 145 buses.

Two of the city bus routes, the 75 and 62, provide trunk cross-city service, serving parts of Dresden not served tram routes. Most of the remaining bus routes are intended as a supplement to the tramway network, and are designed to cross the main radial tram routes at a right or oblique angle.

The modernization of the bus fleet has been significantly faster than that of the tram fleet. By 2001 the last GDR era Ikarus bus had been retired. Today, the DVB uses a fleet of buses manufactured by EvoBus (under the Mercedes-Benz bus brand), MAN and Solaris. The whole fleet has a low floor, and over 100 of the buses are articulated. By now, 18 hybrid busses are operated.

Most of the DVB's bus fleet operate out of the central bus depot at Gruna, south-east of the inner city. However some 30 to 40 vehicles are kept at the Trachenberge tram depot.

Night buses
DVB provides a night service named  ('goodnight line'), which operates every day of the week (Monday-Sunday), although the frequency of the buses is greater on Friday, Saturday and before holidays when the routes run every 30 minutes between 22:45 and 04:45. DVB also provides an extension taxi service called  (or 'alita' for short) where taxis run on certain routes as a replacement for regular trams and buses at times of very low demand. Alita trips are considered normal public transport trips and do not cost more than a bus ticket. The customer can order one of these special taxis themselves, or, between 10 p.m. and 4 a.m. can request one from the tram or bus driver who is driving them, who will contact an alita taxi to wait at the passengers intended exit stop to facilitate their onward journey. Postplatz is the most important hub for night-time travel in Dresden. Most GuteNachtLinie routes meet here at the same time to allow people to switch routes. Further night travel in the Upper Elbe region is provided by VVO.

Other modes

Besides the tram and bus networks, common to many German cities, the DVB also operates two less common modes of city transportation.

Funicular railways
The DVB operates two very different funicular railways within Dresden. Both start from lower terminals close to each other, in the district of Loschwitz and near to the famous Blue Wonder bridge over the River Elbe.

Both funiculars are operated by two cars, which counterbalance each other. The Standseilbahn is single track with a passing loop, whilst the Schwebebahn has two parallel 'tracks' on its substantial elevated structure. Both are electrically propelled.

Ferries
The DVB operates three ferry services across the River Elbe in Dresden. The Pillnitz to Kleinzschachwitz Ferry carries both passengers and cars. The Laubegast to Niederpoyritz Ferry and Johannstadt to Neustadt Ferry are both pedestrian only.

The ferry services are maintained by a fleet of four passenger-only ferries and one car and passenger ferry. All the vessels are diesel propelled but of different designs. The oldest ferry dates from 1927 and the most recent from 2012. The smallest ferry carries a maximum of 60 passengers, whilst the largest passenger ferry carries up to 120. The car ferry can carry 140 passenger and 8 cars, or 350 passengers if no cars are carried. All ferries are painted in the DVB's yellow and white livery.

References

External links 

 Webpage of the DVB with route maps, construction works, facts, news and more
 History of tram routes
 Collection of photos of different trams
 Kategorie:Straßenbahn im Dresdner Stadtwiki

Companies based in Dresden
 
Government-owned companies of Germany
Public transport operators of Germany
Transport in Dresden
1450 mm gauge railways